The 2019 MLS Homegrown Game (also known as the 2019 MLS Homegrown Game presented by Energizer for sponsorship reasons) was the sixth edition of the Major League Soccer Homegrown Game. It was held on July 30 at the ESPN Wide World of Sports Complex in Orlando, Florida and saw a team of MLS Homegrowns play against Mexican youth team Chivas U-20s. The event is held annually in conjunction with the MLS All-Star Game. In 2019, the Homegrown Game preceded the new MLS All-Star Skills Challenge.

MLS announced a 22-player Homegrown roster on July 10, 2019 with second set announced on July 24 along with three withdrawals. The final roster totaled 24 players from 18 different MLS clubs including two from host team Orlando City. Marcelo Neveleff, Orlando City Academy director, was selected as head coach.

Squads

MLS Homegrowns

Notes:
Withdrew from squad prior to match.

Chivas U-20s

Match

References 

Homegrown Game
MLS Homegrown Game
MLS Homegrown Game
2010s in Orlando, Florida
July 2019 sports events in the United States
Homegrown Game
Association football penalty shoot-outs